Zapovedny is a rural locality (a settlement) in Novoposelenovsky Selsoviet Rural Settlement, Kursky District, Kursk Oblast, Russia. Population:

Geography 
The settlement is located 75 km from the Russia–Ukraine border, 18 km south-west of Kursk, 7 km from the selsoviet center – 1st Tsvetovo.

 Climate
Zapovedny has a warm-summer humid continental climate (Dfb in the Köppen climate classification).

Transport 
Zapovedny is located 0.5 km from the federal route  Crimea Highway (a part of the European route ), on the road of intermunicipal significance  ("Crimea Highway" – Beryozka), 9 km from the nearest railway halt 457 km (railway line Lgov I — Kursk).

The rural locality is situated 25 km from Kursk Vostochny Airport, 107 km from Belgorod International Airport and 219 km from Voronezh Peter the Great Airport.

References

Notes

Sources

Rural localities in Kursky District, Kursk Oblast